The Korean Christian Fundamentalist Assembly is a Presbyterian and Reformed denomination in South Korea founded in 2014 under the influence of Rev. Gerald Jones who graduated from Bob Jones College and came to Korea and established the Maranatha Seminary. The Fundamentalist teaching found favorable ground in Korea. Ian Paisley and Bob Jones organised the World Fundamentalist Conference in Edinburgh.
The church adheres to the Apostles Creed and Westminster Confession. In 2004 it had 18,262 members and 116 congregations.

References 

Presbyterian denominations in South Korea
Presbyterian denominations in Asia
Fundamentalist denominations